On 23 January 2015, there was a bombing at the civil court premises of Ara, Bhojpur district, Bihar, India.

Blast
There was a blast in the civil court premises around 11:35 am IST. A suspected woman might have carried out the suicide bombing as per initial findings. Two persons along with the woman were killed in the blast, one of them was a police constable. At least seven more people were injured in the attack. Taking advantage of the chaos following the blast, two criminals under trial who were brought to the court for a hearing fled the premises.

Investigation
Bihar Police searched the whole court premises.
The police arrested Sunil Pandey, the Janata Dal (United) politician, in connection with the crime.

Additional Director General of Police Gupteshwar Pandey said the woman was carrying the bomb in her purse and it had exploded accidentally, denying she was a suicide bomber. The woman was identified as Rina Gaudh, the district magistrate of Bhojpur said she was trying to help two prisoners escape, she didn't carry out a terror attack.

References

2015 murders in Asia
Suicide bombings in 2015
Terrorist incidents in India in 2015
2010s in Bihar
2015 murders in India
January 2015 crimes in Asia
January 2015 events in India
Arrah
Crime in Bihar
Suicide bombings in India